De Olifant (English: The Elephant) is a smock mill in Burdaard, Friesland, Netherlands which has been restored to working order. The mill is listed as a Rijksmonument, number 35673.

History

De Olifant was originally built at Oostwold, Groningen in 1856 where it drained the Oosterwolderpolder. In 1867 it was moved to Burdaard where it drained the Olifantpolder. The cost of purchase and re-erection was ƒ2,000. The mill worked until 1970 when it was taken out of use. The mill was sold to Stichting De Fryske Mole on 20 June 1977. Restoration was carried out in 1978-79 and again in 1991.

Description

De Olifant is a smock mill winded by a winch. There is no stage, the sails reaching almost to the ground. The mill has a single-storey brick base and a two-storey smock. The smock has vertical weatherboarding and the cap is thatched. The windshaft also carries the brake wheel, which has 65 cogs. This drives the wallower (37 cogs) at the top of the upright shaft. At the bottom of the upright shaft, the great spur wheel (71 cogs) drives three wooden shafts, each of which drives a wooden Archimedes' screw via another set of gears. Two of the Archimedes' screws drain the "Olifant polder", while the third pumps water into the polder.

The drive to the larger of the two Archimedes' screws that drain the polder is from a 38-cog gear wheel meshing with the great spur wheel. This drives a 35-cog gear wheel which drives the Archimedes' screw via a 46-cog gear wheel on the axle of the Archimedes' screw. It is inclined at an angle of 17½°. Each revolution of the screw lifts  of water.

The drive to the smaller of the two Archimedes' screws that drain the polder is from a 36 cog gear wheel meshing with the great spur wheel. This drives a 33-cog gear wheel which drives the Archimedes' screw via a 41-cog gear wheel on the axle of the Archimedes' screw. It is inclined at an angle of 121°. Each revolution of the screw lifts  of water.

The drive to the Archimedes' screw that pumps water into the polder is from a 38-cog gear wheel meshing with the great spur wheel. This drives a 25 stave gear wheel which drives  a wallower (30 cogs). The wallower drives a gear wheel with 31 cogs. This drives a cast-iron gear wheel with 48 teeth. This drives the Archimedes' screw via a cast-iron gear wheel with 60 cogs on the axle of the Archimedes' screw. It is inclined at an angle of 16°. Each revolution of the screw lifts  of water.

Public access

De Olifant is open to the public by appointment.

References

External links

Windmills in Friesland
Windmills completed in 1867
Smock mills in the Netherlands
Rijksmonuments in Friesland
Octagonal buildings in the Netherlands